Chowrangee Assembly constituency is a Legislative Assembly constituency of Kolkata district in the Indian state of West Bengal.

Overview
As per orders of the Delimitation Commission, No. 162 Chowrangee Assembly constituency is composed of the following: Ward Nos. 44, 45, 46, 47, 48, 49, 50, 51, 52, 53 and 62 of Kolkata Municipal Corporation.

Chowrangee Assembly constituency is part of No. 24 Kolkata Uttar (Lok Sabha constituency). Prior to the 2009 Indian general election it was part of Calcutta South (Lok Sabha constituency).

Members of Legislative Assembly

Election results

2021

2016

By-election, 2014

A by-election was held on 13 September 2014 following the resignation of the sitting MLA, Shikha Chowdhury (Mitra) who switched over from Trinamool Congress to Congress.

2011

References

Assembly constituencies of West Bengal
Politics of Kolkata district